Thangal Kunju Musaliar Centenary Public School (TKMCPS) was started by Thangal Kunju Musaliar College Trust in the academic year 1997–8 in commemoration of the birth centenary of its founder, late Jb. A Thangal Kunju Musaliar-the educationalist, industrialist and philanthropist. The formal inauguration of this supreme venture was on 12 June 1997 by Jb. Shahal Hassan Musaliar, the President of TKM College Trust.

Location 
The school located in the TKM College campus beside the TKM College of Arts & Science at Karicode, a suburb of the historical coastal city of Kollam.

Facilities
 Laboratories
 Library
 Canteen
 Stationery shop

References

Schools in Kollam
1997 establishments in Kerala